Carly Jibson (born 1984) is an American actress, singer and writer. She is best known for her role in the Broadway musical Hairspray as Tracy Turnblad. She also starred in the TV series The Guest Book and One Mississippi.

Life and career
Jibson was raised in Michigan. She dropped out of Mona Shores High School in 2002, after which she moved to New York City. She originated the role of Tracy Turnblad in the first national touring production of Hairspray. In 2003–6, she took on the same role in the Broadway production of Hairspray. In 2006, she appeared as Baby Manicotti in Andrew Lippa's Asphalt Beach. In 2008, she originated the role of Pepper Walker in the musical Cry-Baby on Broadway. She released her debut recording, Best of me, in 2011.

In 2017, Jibson was cast as Desiree in the Amazon Video original comedy series One Mississippi and on the TBS comedy seriesThe Guest Book as Vivian.

Filmography

Theatre

Television

Discography
 Dreaming Wide Awake (2007)
 Best of Me (2011)
 Cry Baby (2015)

References

External links
 
 
 

1984 births
Living people
American television actresses
American women singers
20th-century American actresses
21st-century American actresses
American musical theatre actresses
American stage actresses